HMS Hastings was a 32-gun fifth rate built under contract by Thomas Ellis of Shoreham in 1694/95. She spent her brief career on counter piracy patrols and trade protection duties in Home Waters. She was wrecked in a storm off Waterford in December 1697.

She was the first vessel to carry the name Hastings in the English and Royal Navy.

Construction and Specifications
She was ordered on 2 April 1694 to be built under contract by Thomas Ellis of Shoreham. She was launched on 5 February 1695. Her builder’s measure tonnage was calculated as 383 tons (burthen).

The gun armament initially was four demi-culverins on the lower deck (LD) with two pair of guns per side. The upper deck (UD) battery would consist of between twenty and twenty-two 6-pounder guns with ten or eleven guns per side. The gun battery would be completed by four 4-pounder guns on the quarterdeck (QD) with two to three guns per side.

Commissioned Service 1695-1697
HMS Hastings was commissioned on 18 June 1695 under the command of Captain John Draper for service in the West Indies. She returned to Home Waters with a convoy. She was assigned to Irish Waters in 1696. In 1697 she was escorting timber ships to Kinsale, Ireland.

Loss
She was wrecked in a storm off Waterford on 10 December 1697 with the loss of all hands.

Notes

Citations

References

 Winfield (2009), British Warships in the Age of Sail (1603 – 1714), by Rif Winfield, published by Seaforth Publishing, England © 2009, EPUB 
 Colledge (2020), Ships of the Royal Navy, by J.J. Colledge, revised and updated by Lt Cdr Ben Warlow and Steve Bush, published by Seaforth Publishing, Barnsley, Great Britain, © 2020, EPUB 
 Lavery (1989), The Arming and Fitting of English Ships of War 1600 - 1815, by Brian Lavery, published by US Naval Institute Press © Brian Lavery 1989, Part V Guns, Type of Guns
 Clowes (1898), The Royal Navy, A History from the Earliest Times to the Present (Vol. II). London. England: Sampson Low, Marston & Company, © 1898

 

Frigates of the Royal Navy
Ships of the Royal Navy
1690s ships